Deborah Billian was a Democratic member of the New Hampshire House of Representatives, representing the Strafford 1st District starting in 2006.

External links
New Hampshire House of Representatives - Deborah Billian official NH House website
Project Vote Smart - Representative Deborah Billian (NH) profile
Follow the Money - Deborah Billian
2006 campaign contributions

Members of the New Hampshire House of Representatives
Living people
Women state legislators in New Hampshire
Year of birth missing (living people)
21st-century American women